Manitoba is one of Canada's 10 provinces. It is the easternmost of the three Prairie provinces.

Manitoba's capital and largest city (containing over half its population) is Winnipeg. Other important cities and towns include Brandon, Thompson, Dauphin, Swan River, Churchill, The Pas, Selkirk, Portage la Prairie, Gimli, Flin Flon, Steinbach, Morden, Virden, Minnedosa, Emerson, Lockport, Neepawa,  and Winkler.

Over one million people live in Manitoba's southern regions, in a small string of cities and towns (Winnipeg, Brandon, etc.) about the size of Ontario's Golden Horseshoe.

Population history

Source: Statistics Canada

Principal Urban Areas

Winnipeg

More than half of Manitoba's 1,148,801 population live in the urban area surrounding the city of Winnipeg. The urban area (UA) covers 448.92 square kilometres and had a 2006 census population of 641,483 (which was an increase of 2.3% from 2001). The City of Winnipeg itself had a 2011 census population of 636,617 (an increase of 4.8% over 2006).

Manitoba Census Division No. 11, which includes both the City of Winnipeg and the Rural Municipality of Headingley, had a 2011 population of 666,832 (an increase of 4.8%). The Rural Municipality of Headingley had a 2011 census population of 3,215  (an increase of 17.9% from 2006) but is not counted as part of the Urban Area by Census Canada.

The Winnipeg Census Metropolitan Area (CMA) includes all of Census Division No. 11 as well as parts of Divisions 02, 10, 12, 13, and 14, and had a 2006 population of 694,668 (which was an increase of 2.7%). The Winnipeg Capital Region comprises the CMA and additional portions of Census Divisions 10, 13, and 14.

Census Division No. 13 includes the Regional Municipality of East St. Paul (with a population of 8,733, of whom 7,475 were included in the population of the UA) and the Regional Municipality of West St. Paul (with a population of 4,357 of whom 2,234 were included in the population of the UA). The Regional Municipality of St. Clements (population 9,706) and the Indian Reservation of Brokenhead 4 (population 467) are also part of the CMA. The Regional Municipality of St. Andrews (population 11,359) along with the City of Selkirk (population 9,515) are to some degree a distinct Urban Area (See 6. below) and while they are part of the Winnipeg Capital Region they are not part of the CMA. The Village of Dunnottar (population 692) is also not part of the CMA.

Census Division No. 02 includes the Regional Municipality of Taché which had a population of 9,083 including the unincorporated Urban Area of Lorette (1,447), and also includes the Regional Municipality of Ritchot which had a population of 5,051 including the unincorporated Urban Area of St. Adolphe (1,048). These Regional Municipalities are both part of the CMA and of the Region. The Regional Municipality of Hanover (population 11,871) and the City of Steinbach (population 11,066) are to some degree a distinct Urban Area (see 5. below). The Town of Niverville (population 2,464) is wedged in between the Regional Municipalities of Hanover and Taché.
Census Division No. 02 also includes several other subdivisions.

Census Division No. 12 includes the Rural Municipality of Springfield which had a population of 12,990 including the unincorporated Urban Area of Oakbank (2,075), and which is part of the CMA and the Region. The only other subdivisions of Census Division No. 12 are the City of Beasejour (2,823) and the Rural Municipality of Brokenhead (3,940) both of which are not part of the CMA or the Region.

Census Division No. 10 includes the Regional Municipalities of Macdonald (5,653) and St. François Xavier (1,087).both of which are part of the CMA and the Region. The only other subdivision of Census Division No. 10 is the Regional Municipality of Cartier (3,162) which is part of the Region but not of the CMA.

Census Division No. 14 includes the Regional Municipality of Rosser (1,364) which is part of the CMA. The Regional Municipality of Rockwood with a population of 7,692 including the unincorporated Urban Area of Stony Mountain (1,757), is part of the Region but not part of the CMA. The Town of Stonewall (population 4,376) is a distinct Urban Area (see 12. below). Stonewall and the Town of Teulon (1,124), are completely surrounded by Rockwood. The only other subdivision of Census Division No. 10 is the Regional Municipality of Woodlands (3,562) which is not part of the CMA or of the Region.

Brandon

The City of Brandon had a 2011 census population of 46,061 which was the same as the population of the Urban Area. The Brandon Census Agglomeration had a 2006 census population of 48,256 including the Rural Municipality of Cornwallis, which had a population of 4,058 including the unincorporated urban area of Shilo CFB-BFC (1,314). The Rural Municipality of Whitehead (1,402) and the Rural Municipality of Elton (1,285) are also part of the Census Agglomeration. Brandon is located in Census Division No. 07, which had a 2011 census population of 64,317 and is part of Manitoba's Westman Region. There are several other subdivisions of Census Division No. 07

Steinbach

The City of Steinbach had a 2011 census population of 13,524 which was the same as the population of the urban area. Steinbach is located in Census Division No. 02 which had a 2011 census population of 65,384 and which is part of Manitoba's Eastman Region. Also included in this Census Division (CD) is the Regional Municipality of Hanover (population 14,026), which surrounds the City of Steinbach on three sides, and the Regional Municipalities of Taché and Ritchot which are part of the Winnipeg CMA. The Town of Niverville, with a population of 3,540, is wedged in between the Regional Municipalities of Hanover and Taché.

Portage la Prairie

The City of Portage la Prairie had a 2011 census population of 12,996. The population of the Urban Area was 12,996. The Portage la Prairie Census Agglomeration had a 2006 census population of 20,494, including the Regional Municipality of Portage la Prairie (6,793) as well as several Indian Reservations. Portage la Prairie is located in Census Division No. 09 which had a 2011 census population of 23,489 and is part of Manitoba's Central Plains Region.

Thompson

The City of Thompson had a 2011 census population of 12,829 which was the same as the population of the urban area. The Thompson Census Agglomeration had a 2006 census population of 13,593, including the Local Government District of Mystery Lake (147).
Thompson is located in Census Division No. 22 which had a 2011 census population of 40,923 and is part of Manitoba's Northern Region. The next most populous subdivisions of this Census Division (CD) were the Indian Reservations of Norway House 17 (population 4,758) and St. Theresa Point (population 2,871).

Winkler

The City of Winkler had a 2011 census population of 10,670 which was the same as the population of the Urban Area. Winkler is located in Census Division No. 03 which had a 2011 census population of 51,350 and is part of Manitoba's Pembina Valley Region. The City of Winkler is surrounded by the Regional Municipality of Stanley. There are many other subdivisions of this Census Division.

Selkirk

The City of Selkirk had a 2011 census population of 9,834. The population of the Urban Area was 9,834.

Dauphin

The City of Dauphin had a 2016 census population of 8,457 which was the same as the population for the Urban Area. Dauphin is located in Census Division No. 17 which had a 2016 census population of 22,205 and is part of Manitoba's Parkland Region. Also included in this Census Division is the Regional Municipality of Dauphin (2,388) which surrounds the City of Dauphin.

Other urban areas

The Town of Morden had a 2011 census population of 7,812, which was the same as the population for the urban area,  and is located in Census Division No. 03. Morden is surrounded by the Regional Municipality of Stanley.(6,367).

The Town of The Pas had a 2011 census population of 5,513. The population of the Urban Area was 5,513 and includes part of the Opaskwayak Cree Nation 21A Indian Reserve. The Pas is located in Census Division No. 21 which had a 2011 census population of 21,393 and is part of Manitoba's Northern Region.

The City of Flin Flon had a 2011 census population of 5,363. The population of the Manitoba part of the Urban Area was also 5,363. Flin Flon is also located in Census Division No. 21.

The Town of Stonewall had a 2011 census population of 4,536 which was the same as the population for the Urban Area. Stonewall is located in Census Division No. 14 which had a 2011 census population of 18,497 and is part of Manitoba's Interlake Region. Stonewall is surrounded by  the Regional Municipality of Rockwood (7,692).

The Town of Altona had a 2011 census population of 4,082. The population of the Urban Area was 4,082. Altona is located in Census Division No. 3 which had a 2011 census population of 51,350 and which is part of Manitoba's Pembina Valley Region.

The Town of Swan River had a 2011 census population of 3,907 which was the same as the population of the Urban Area. Swan River is located in Census Division No. 20 which had a 2011 census population of 9,952 and is part of Manitoba's Parkland Region. Also included in this Census Division is the Regional Municipality of Swan River (2,784).

The Town of Neepawa had a 2011 census population of 3,629 which was the same as the population of the Urban Area. Neepawa is located in Census Division No. 6 which had a 2011 census population of 21,604 and is part of Manitoba's Westman Region.

Source: Statistics CanadaSource: Statistics Canada

Ethnic origins
Note: the percentages do not necessarily add up to 100% as multiple responses are allowed. Ethnic origins with less than 2% of the responses are not listed.

22.1% English
19.1% German
18.5% Scottish
18.2% Canadian
14.7% Ukrainian
13.4% Irish
13.1% French
  10.6% First Nation
  7.3% Polish
  6.4% Métis
  4.9% Dutch (Netherlands)
  4.0% Russian
  3.4% Filipino
  2.7% Icelandic

Manitoba is home to the largest Icelandic population outside of Iceland. There are 30,555 people with Icelandic ancestry living in Manitoba, making up 2.7% of the total population of Manitoba . About 35% of the Icelandic-Canadian population lives in Manitoba.

Future projections

Visible minorities and Aboriginals

Language

Knowledge of languages

The question on knowledge of languages allows for multiple responses. The following figures are from the 2021 Canadian Census and the 2016 Canadian Census and lists languages that were selected by at least one per cent of respondents.

Mother tongue
The 2006 census showed a population of 1,148,401. Of the 1,118,690 singular responses to the census question concerning mother tongue the languages most commonly reported were:

Note: "n.i.e.": not included elsewhere

There were also about 430 single-language responses for Bisayan languages; 395 for Niger–Congo languages n.i.e.; and 350 for Tigrigna; as well as about 345 for non-verbal languages (sign languages); 340 for Bengali; 330 for Finnish; 325 for Sinhala; 310 for Kurdish; 275 for Tamil; 260 for Slovenian; 230 for Latvian; 220 for Hebrew; and about 220 as well for Slavic languages n.i.e.; and 210 for Indo-Iranian languages n.i.e.; 195 for Malayo-Polynesian languages n.i.e; 180 for Oromo; 170 for Pampango; 155 for Celtic languages; 155 for Macedonian; 140 for Inuktitut; 135 for Lithuanian; 120 for Bulgarian; and about 120 as well for Malayalam. {Mother tongues of more than 114 persons (0.01%) are listed.}
In addition to the single-language responses detailed above, about 34,935 people reported having more than one mother tongue. There were about 11,675 responses of English and a non-official language; 465 of French and a non-official language; 2,630 of both English and French; and 85 of English, French and a non-official language. Approximately 2,555 people reported having Tagalog as a dual mother tongue; while about 2,060 people reported having German; 1,510 people reported having Cree; 1,385 Ukrainian; 645 Ojibway; 475 Spanish; 365 Portuguese; 310 Polish; and about 280 people reported having Panjabi, as a dual mother tongue. {Dual mother tongues of more than 228 persons (0.02%) are listed.}

Religion
43.2% Protestant
29.3% Roman Catholic
4.0% Christian not included elsewhere
1.4% Christian Orthodox
1.1% Jewish
18.6% No religious affiliation
Religions that make up less than 1% are not listed.

Migration

Immigration 

The 2021 census reported that immigrants (individuals born outside Canada) comprise 257,620 persons or 19.7 percent of the total population of Manitoba.

Recent immigration 
The 2021 Canadian census counted a total of 58,370 people who immigrated to Manitoba between 2016 and 2021.

Interprovincial migration

Manitoba is one of the provinces most affected by Interprovincial migration, having had a negative mobility ratio for 42 out of 46 years from 1971 to 2017. This is the second-worst record for years of negative interprovincial migration, followed only by Quebec.

Source: Statistics Canada

See also

Demographics of Canada
Population of Canada by province and territory
Franco-Manitoban

Notes

References

Manitoba
Manitoba society